Liolaemus sanjuanensis, the San Juan tree iguana, is a species of lizard in the family  Liolaemidae. It is native to Argentina.

References

sanjuanensis
Reptiles described in 1982
Reptiles of Argentina
Endemic fauna of Argentina
Taxa named by José Miguel Alfredo María Cei